Anthony Pipolo, known professionally as Tom Palmer was an Italian-American animator and short film director who was active in the 1930s and worked at several animation studios.  He was born with the surname of "Pipolo" but changed his name to Palmer. One of his brothers, Frank Pipolo, was a decorated New York City police officer.

Career 

Born in New York City, Palmer's first animation credits occurred at the Winkler Studio in 1928 which made Oswald the Lucky Rabbit cartoons.  Palmer moved over to Universal Pictures cartoon studio run by Walter Lantz which took over the Oswald series in 1929.  By the early 1930s, he was working at Walt Disney Productions. He was lured by Leon Schlesinger to work as an animation director at his newly formed Leon Schlesinger Productions animation studio which made cartoons for Warner Bros.

By June 1933, Palmer was named the production manager and main director of the studio, with Jack King as the head animator. Among the staff were two former associates of Palmer from Disney, animators Paul Fennell and Bill Mason. According to animation historian Michael Barrier, Schlesinger placed former Disney animators in charge of the studio in hopes of effectively competing with the Disney studio.

The first task for the new studio staff was finding a new continuing character to replace Bosko as the star of the Looney Tunes series. Barrier credits Palmer with introducing Buddy to serve as the intended replacement. Like Bosko and Mickey Mouse, Buddy had a girlfriend and a pet dog as supporting characters. He was more recognizably human than either of his predecessors, a prepubescent boy. He was more reminiscent of the boy protagonists of contemporary comic strips, such as Out Our Way.

Palmer's only two credited Warner Bros. cartoons were 1933's Buddy's Day Out and I've Got to Sing a Torch Song. Palmer's approach in directing Buddy's Day Out was reportedly rather loose. In the story conferences which determined the contents of the film, Palmer would suggest adding "a funny piece of business", a visual gag. He failed to specify the use of anything particularly funny. According to later interviews with Bernard B. Brown and Bob Clampett, Palmer's original version of the film was virtually devoid of gags. The Warner Bros. studio rejected this version and the film had to be reworked extensively. Barrier considers the finished film, with gags added, to also have been "desperately unfunny". The gags were neither as well conceived, nor as well executed as those found in the animated short films of Disney.

Palmer was fired by Schlesinger after Warner Bros. rejected the cartoons that he had produced. Friz Freleng was called in to rework Palmer's cartoons and ultimately replaced him as the studio's head director. Palmer's initial replacement as director, however, was Earl Duvall.

After leaving Warner Bros., Palmer worked at the Van Beuren Studio until it folded in 1936.  He briefly returned to Disney where he worked on the cartoon The Old Mill. His final credited work was as an animation director for the feature film Gulliver's Travels (1939) at Fleischer Studios.

Filmography 
 Ozzie of the Circus (Short) (animator; 1929)
 Nutty Notes (Short) (animator; 1929)
 Snow Use (Short) (animator; 1929)
 Hurdy Gurdy (animator; 1929)
 Amature Nite (Short) (animator; 1929)
 Pussy Willie (Short) (animator; 1929)
 Cold Turkey (Short) (animator; 1929)
 Permanent Wave (animator; 1929)
 Oil's Well (animator; 1929)
 Alpine Antics (animator and director; 1929)
 Yanky Clippers (animator and director; 1929)
 Kounty Fair (animator; 1930)
 Broadway Folly (animator; 1930)
 Chilly Con Carmen (animator; 1930)
 Kounty Fair (animator; 1930) 
 Playful Pan (animator; 1930))
 Pioneer Days (animator; 1930)
 Winter (animator; 1930)
 The Picnic (animator; 1930)
 The Gorilla Mystery (animator; 1930)
 Midnight in a Toy Shop (animator; 1930)
 The Fire Fighters (animator; 1930)
 Frolicking Fish (animator; 1930)
 Cannibal Capers (animator; 1930)
 Monkey Melodies (animator; 1930)
 The Chain Gang  (animator; 1930)
 Night (animator; 1930)
 The Birthday Party (animator; 1931)
 Birds of a Feather (animator; 1931)
 Traffic Troubles  (animator; 1931)
 Mother Goose Melodies (animator; 1931)
 The Beach Party (animator; 1931)
 Fishin' Around (animator; 1931)
 Blue Rhythm (animator; 1931)
 Mickey Cuts Up (animator; 1931)
 Mickey's Orphans (animator; 1931)
 The Klondike Kid (animator; 1932)
 Mickey in Arabia (animator; 1932)
 Just Dogs (animator; 1932)
 Flowers and Trees (animator; 1932)
 Trader Mickey (animator; 1932)
 The Whoopee Party (animator; 1932)
  Babes in the Woods (animator; 1932)
 Santa's Workshop (animator; 1932)
 Mickey's Good Deed (animator; 1932)
 Bugs in Love (animator; 1932)
 Mickey Plays Papa (animator; 1932)
 The Mail Pilot (Short) (animator; 1932)
 Mickey's Mellerdrammer (animator; 1932)
 The Mad Doctor (animator; 1933)
 Building a Building (animator; 1933)
 Buddy's Day Out (director; 1933)
 I've Got to Sing a Torch Song (director; 1933)
 The Golden Touch (animator; 1935)
 Three Little Wolves (animator; 1936)
 Neptune Nonsense (animator; 1936)
 Mickey's Amateurs (animator; 1937)
 The Old Mill (animator; 1937)
 Mickey's Trailer (animator; 1938)
 Mickey's Parrot (animator; 1938)
 Gulliver's Travels (animator; 1939)

References

Sources

External links 

Animators from New York (state)
Artists from New York City
American people of Italian descent
American animated film directors
Film directors from New York City
Walt Disney Animation Studios people
Warner Bros. Cartoons directors
Fleischer Studios people
Year of birth missing
Year of death missing